Uncle Sam Gets Around is a song from 1941, composed by Ralph Rainger with lyrics by Leo Robin for the 20th Century-Fox film Cadet Girl.

In the song, Uncle Sam is a personified version of the United States, in which he helps people all across the country. In the film Cadet Girl, the song is performed by actor Shepperd Strudwick.

References

Songs of World War II
Songs with lyrics by Leo Robin
Songs with music by Ralph Rainger
1941 songs